Wolfenbarger is a surname and an altered form of Swiss German Wolfensberger surname, and may refer to:

 Floyd Orson Wolfenbarger (1904–1979), American architect active in Kansas
 Janet C. Wolfenbarger (born 1958), American military general in the United States Air Force

See also 

 David Wolfenberger (born 1969), American singer and songwriter

Swiss-German surnames